Jacques "Jacky" Munaron (born 8 September 1956) is a Belgian former football goalkeeper and the goalkeeper coach of FP Halle-Gooik since 2017.

As a young player, Munaron started as the keeper of the youth team of FC Dinant, and Munaron stayed in Dinant and became a player of the A-team. FC Dinant played in the Third Division at that time. In 1974, Munaron was discovered by RSC Anderlecht and moved to Brussels.

Over there, he was only a substitute player, as Jan Ruiter, the Dutch keeper of Anderlecht, was the first choice of the trainer. Also later, when Anderlecht bought Nico de Bree, another Dutch player of RWDM, Munaron was a substitute player.

Munaron got some chances to play and quickly became the real number one of Anderlecht. Ruiter left in 1977 and De Bree was sold in 1980, but Munaron stayed. Munaron stayed in total 15 seasons in Anderlecht, from 1974 until 1989. He was four times national champion with Anderlecht and won the Belgian Cup four times. He also played as Anderlecht won the 1983 UEFA Cup Final.

In 1988 the competition within the team was stronger again. Munaron became older and Anderlecht picked the younger keeper Filip De Wilde more frequently. As a result, Munaron moved to Club Liège in 1989. At Liège he won another Belgian Cup in 1990.

In 1992 Standard de Liège wanted to buy Munaron from Club Liège and Munaron made the move. The keeper was 36 years at that time and became a substitute, because Gilbert Bodart was the first keeper at Standard in the early '90s.

In 1995 Munaron joined Eendracht Aalst, but in 1996 he decided to retire. He played eight times for the Belgium national team throughout his career.

After his career as a player, Munaron became a trainer. He was keeper-trainer of Belgium, RSC Anderlecht and the Turkish team Trabzonspor. From the season 2010–11 he worked for AA Gent, but at the start of 2014–15 he left the club. He went to FCV Dender to become goalkeeper coach. After this adventure he became the goalkeeper coach of Royal Excelsior Mouscron (Belgian first division).

At the end of the season 2016–2017 Munaron was pushed away from REM in a very disrespectful manner, making him decide to leave football and choose a new challenge, namely Futsal.

As of 1 July 2017, Munaron became a goalkeeper coach at FP Halle-Gooik (a Belgian top club who has become champion in the first grade of Futsal in the last 3 years). Again, he will be able to enjoy football again at a high level, as FP Halle-Gooik also participates in the Futsal Champions League.

Honours

Player 

 RSC Anderlecht

 Belgian First Division: 1980–81, 1984–85, 1985–86, 1986–87
 Belgian Cup: 1974-75, 1975–76, 1987–88, 1988–89
 Belgian Supercup: 1985, 1987
 European Cup Winners' Cup: 1975–76 (winners), 1976-77 (runners-up), 1977–78 (winners)
 European Super Cup: 1976, 1978
 UEFA Cup: 1982–83 (winners), 1983-84 (runners-up)
 Amsterdam Tournament: 1976
 Jules Pappaert Cup: 1977, 1983, 1985
 Belgian Sports Merit Award: 1978
 Bruges Matins: 1985, 1988

RFC Liège 

 Belgian Cup: 1989-90

Standard de Liège 

 Belgian Cup: 1992-93

Goalkeeper coach 
Kampioen van België – Champion de Belgique – Belgian Champion
2000, 2001, 2004, 2006, 2007 (RSC Anderlecht)
Belgische Super Cup – Super Coupe de Belgique – Belgian Super Cup
2000, 2001, 2006, 2007
Kwalificatie Champions League – Qualification Champions League
2000, 2001, 2002, 2003, 2004, 2005 2nd Round : 2001
Europees Kampioenschap – Championnat d'Europe – European Championship
EURO 2000 (Belgium – Netherlands)
Wereldbeker – Coupe du Monde – World Cup
2002 (Japan – South Korea)
Olympische Zomerspelen – Jeux olympiques d'été – Summer Olympics
2008 (China – Beijing) – National Team of Belgium U21 (4th place)

References

External links
 
 
 

1956 births
Living people
Belgian footballers
Belgium international footballers
Association football goalkeepers
R.S.C. Anderlecht players
RFC Liège players
Standard Liège players
Belgian Pro League players
1982 FIFA World Cup players
UEFA Euro 1984 players
1986 FIFA World Cup players
UEFA Cup winning players
Sportspeople from Namur (city)
Footballers from Namur (province)